Halgerda onna is a species of sea slug, a dorid nudibranch, shell-less marine gastropod mollusks in the family Discodorididae.

Distribution 
This species was described from Onna Village, Okinawa. It is also reported from Guam.

References

Discodorididae
Gastropods described in 2001